Dan Michael Vitale III (born October 26, 1993) is a former American football fullback. He played college football at Northwestern and was drafted by the Tampa Bay Buccaneers in the sixth round of the 2016 NFL Draft. He was also a member of the Cleveland Browns, Green Bay Packers, and New England Patriots.

Early life and high school career
Vitale was born one of two sons to Lisa and Dan Vitale. His brother Tommy played as a linebacker while at Northwestern University. Vitale attended high school in Wheaton, Illinois, the same as former football player Red Grange, actor John Belushi and astronomer Edwin Hubble. 

While attending Wheaton high school, Vitale earned distinctions including places on the honor roll and National Honor Society. He played high school football as both a wide receiver and running back. During the 2011 season, Vitale earned All-Area and All-State awards. He earned a letter in wrestling where he competed at 152 lbs, lettered two years in football and earned letters three years in track.

College career
Vitale played for Northwestern University beginning his freshman season in 2012. He was named to the Academic All-Big Ten three times, during his sophomore, junior and senior seasons. While at Northwestern, Vitale majored in economics, with minors in Business Institutions and Integrated Marketing Communications.

Professional career

Tampa Bay Buccaneers
Vitale was selected by the Buccaneers in the sixth round of the 2016 NFL Draft with the 197th overall pick. He was released by the Buccaneers as part of final roster cuts on September 3, 2016.

Buffalo Bills
Vitale was claimed off waivers by the Buffalo Bills the next day, but failed his physical examination, voiding the contract.

Tampa Bay Buccaneers (second stint)
On September 10, 2016, he re-joined the Buccaneers as a member of their practice squad.

Cleveland Browns
Vitale was signed off the Buccaneers' practice squad by the Cleveland Browns on October 14, 2016.

On September 1, 2018, Vitale suffered a calf injury and was placed on injured reserve. He was released on October 12, 2018.

Green Bay Packers
Vitale was signed to the Green Bay Packers practice squad on October 22, 2018. He was promoted to the active roster on December 1, 2018. He appeared in five games in the 2018 season.

In the 2019 season, Vitale saw some increased usage in the receiving game with seven receptions for 97 yards. He started in four of the 15 games he appeared in.

New England Patriots
On March 21, 2020, Vitale signed a one-year contract with the New England Patriots. On July 28, 2020, Vitale announced he was opting out of the 2020 season due to the COVID-19 pandemic. He was released after the season on May 27, 2021.

On June 6, 2021, Vitale announced his retirement from professional football.

NFL career statistics

Post-NFL career
Beginning in November 2021, Vitale founded the health and fitness company VITALETY, LLC. In January 2022, Vitale became Financial Advisor and Financial Planning Specialist for the financial services company Morgan Stanley in New York, New York.

References

External links

Green Bay Packers bio
Northwestern Wildcats bio

1993 births
Living people
American football fullbacks
American football tight ends
Cleveland Browns players
Green Bay Packers players
New England Patriots players
Northwestern Wildcats football players
Players of American football from Illinois
Sportspeople from Wheaton, Illinois
Tampa Bay Buccaneers players